"Taxi Ride" is a song by American recording artist Tori Amos from her seventh studio album Scarlet's Walk (2002). The song was released as the album's second single in January 2003. It was written, composed and produced by Amos. The song is a folk pop track, which features instrumentation of electric guitars, drums, bongos, and acoustic guitar. The track was her second offering after departing from Atlantic Records and signed with Epic Records.

"Taxi Ride" received positive reviews from music critics, who complimented the song's production and lyrical delivery. The song charted at thirty-five on the Adult Top 40 and Radio & Records chart in the US. Amos has performed the song on several tours she has commissioned.

Background
Tori Amos' track "Taxi Ride" appears on her seventh studio album, Scarlet's Walk (2002). In September 2001, Amos released her first concept album Strange Little Girls. Motherhood inspired Amos to produce a cover album, recording songs written by men about women and reversing the gender roles to show a woman's perspective. Amos would later reveal that a stimulus for the album was to end her contract with Atlantic without giving them new original songs; Amos felt that since 1998, the label had not been properly promoting her and had trapped her in a contract by refusing to sell her to another label. Nevertheless, Strange Little Girls received mostly favorable reviews from music critics, some who complimented the idea of twisting the male perspective into female views and the composition, while some dismissed this. It sold over 110,000 units in its first week in the US, reaching number four on the Billboard 200.

After leaving Atlantic, she signed to Epic Records to record the Scarlet's Walk album. However, Epic's President Polly Anthony announced her resignation that would be fulfilled in early 2003. Amos personally liked Anthony and was the reason why she signed to the label, so Amos formed Bridge Entertainment Group. However, Epic and Sony Music Entertainment merged with BMG as a result to the industry's sales decline. Despite this, Amos carried on recording the album. Scarlet's Walk was released in October 2002. Through the songs, Amos explores such topics as the history of America, American people, Native American history, pornography, masochism, homophobia and misogyny. It reached number seven on the Billboard 200 and was certified gold by the Recording Industry Association of America (RIAA).

Composition
Written, composed and produced by Amos, "Taxi Ride" is a folk pop song. According to the music sheet at Musicnotes.com, "Taxi Ride" is set in the key of F minor. Performed in a moderately slow rhythmic pace of 80 beats per minute, Amos' vocals range span from F3 to E5. Lyrically, "Taxi Ride" is about the death of Amos' make-up artist and friend Kevyn Aucoin, who died of kidney and liver failure as a result of Acetaminophen toxicity in May 2002.

Amos commented extensively about the lyrical content on the Scarlet Selections;

Release
"Taxi Ride" was released as the second single by Epic from Scarlet's Walk. It was released as a promotional CD single in Europe, which contained the radio edit of the track. The cover artwork features a black-and-white image of Amos, surrounded by an orange-and-white border. A promotional CD was released in Poland by Sony Music Entertainment Polska, which featured the album version of "Taxi Ride".

Reception
"Taxi Ride" received mostly positive reviews from music critics. Greg Fasolino and Michael Zwirn from Trouser Press highlighted "Taxi Ride" and Scarlet's Walk tracks "Another Girl's Paradise" and "Don't Make Me Come to Vegas" as good tracks. They commented “This is her strongest work since Boys for Pele, and one of the best albums of her career.” Stephen Thomas Erlewine from Allmusic highlighted the song as an album stand out. Rolling Stone's editor Greg Kot complimented the lyrical content for being fun, highlighting the line "Even a glamorous bitch can be in need. Slant Magazine's Sal Cinquemani had cited "Taxi Ride" as the album's best track.

Track listing
Promo-only single
 "Taxi Ride" (radio edit) – 3:56

Chart performance

References

Tori Amos songs
2003 singles
Epic Records singles
LGBT-related songs